The Morales Cabinet constituted the 31st to 32nd cabinets of the Republic of Bolivia. It was formed on 22 June 1871 after Agustín Morales took power in a coup d'état, succeeding the Melgarejo cabinet. It was dissolved on 27 November 1872 when Morales was assassinated. All Ministers of State were ratified in their positions by the new cabinet formed by Morales' successor Tomás Frías.

Composition

History 
Upon his assumption to office, Morales charges all ministerial portfolios to Casimiro Corral as secretary general pending the formation of a proper ministerial cabinet. A full council of ministers was appointed on 22 June 1871, 5 months into his mandate, composed of five ministers. In this cabinet, the Ministry of Industry, formed by the government of Mariano Melgarejo in 1869, was abolished. Its portfolios were reassigned to the Ministry of Public Instruction and to an entirely new department, the Ministry of Justice.

A new cabinet was formed on 22 October 1871. With it, the number of ministries was reduced from five to four with the Ministry of Public Instruction being merged into the Ministry of Justice and the industry portfolio becoming annex of the Ministry of Finance. Morales was assassinated on 27 November 1871 and was succeeded the following day by Tomás Frías. Under Frías, this cabinet remained intact for the majority of his term before finally being reformed on 27 January 1873.

Cabinets

Structural changes

References

Notes

Footnotes

Bibliography 

 

1871 establishments in Bolivia
1872 disestablishments in Bolivia
Cabinets of Bolivia
Cabinets established in 1871
Cabinets disestablished in 1872